Sigourney may refer to:

People

Surname
 Edith Sigourney (1895–1982), American tennis player
 James Sigourney (c. 1790–1813), American naval officer
 Lydia Sigourney (1791–1865), American author and poet

Given name
 Sigourney Bandjar (born 1984), Surinamese/Dutch footballer
 Sigourney Beaver, American drag queen and contestant on The Boulet Brothers' Dragula (season 4)
 Father Sigourney Fay, mentor of F. Scott Fitzgerald
 Sigourney Thayer (1896–1944), American theatrical producer
 Sigourney Weaver (born 1949), American actress

Other 
 Sigourney, Iowa, United States
 , two ships of the U.S. Navy
 A variant spelling of the French place-name Sigournais (Vendée)
 Sigourney Howard, a minor male character in F. Scott Fitzgerald's novel The Great Gatsby
 Sigourney "Sissy" Davis, a female character in the 2002 U.S. TV series Family Affair